The first election to Pembrokeshire County Council, was held in January 1889.   It was followed by the 1892 election. The county was divided into numerous single member wards with two or more councillors elected to represent Tenby and Pembroke Dock.

Overview of the result

1889 was a landmark year in the history of Welsh Liberalism, a coming of age symbolized by the triumph across Wales of Liberal candidates in the inaugural county council elections. The Liberal triumph in Pembrokeshire was not as complete as in other Welsh counties but was nevertheless significant. In the north of the county a number of landed gentry were defeated including James Bevan Bowen of Llwyngwair, former MP for the county of Pembrokeshire.
There were only nine unopposed returns, most of whom were Liberals.

Ward Results

Ambleston

Amroth

Begelly

Burton

Camrose

Carew

Clydey

Castlemartin

Eglwyswrw

Fishguard

Haverfordwest St Mary's

Haverfordwest, Prendergast and Uzmaston

Haverfordwest, St Thomas and Furzy Park

Haverfordwest St Martin's

Kilgerran

Lampeter Velfrey

Llanfyrnach

Llanwnda

Llawhaden

Llangwm

Llanstadwell

Maenclochog

Manorbier

Mathry

Milford

Monkton

Nevern

Newport

Narberth North

Pembroke (two seats)

Pembroke Dock (five seats)
None of the candidates were said to have openly run on political lines and no meetings took place during the campaign.

St David's

St Dogmaels

St Ishmaels

St Issels

Slebech and Martletwy

Staynton

Tenby (two seats)

Walwyn's Castle

Whitchurch

Wiston

Election of Aldermen

In addition to the 51 councillors the council consisted of 16 county aldermen. Aldermen were elected by the council, and served a six-year term. Following the election of the initial sixteen aldermen, half of the aldermanic bench would be  elected every three years following the triennial council election. After the initial elections, there were sixteen aldermanic vacancies and the following Alderman were appointed by the newly elected council (with the number of votes cast recorded in each case). A second vote was held to determine which aldermen should retire in three years.

Elected for six years
H. Allen, Liberal (elected councillor for Carew) 42
Lord Kensington, Liberal (elected councillor for St Ishmaels) 42
J. Bevan Bowen, Conservative (defeated candidate at Nevern) 31
Jno Thomas, Llether 30, Liberal
W. Gibbs, Hodgeston 29, Liberal
W. Williams, Haverfordwest 27, Liberal
N.A. Roch, Tenby, Conservative (defeated candidate at Tenby) 24
Captain Higgon 23, Conservative (elected councillor for Wiston)

Elected for three years
W.E. Seccombe, Liberal (elected councillor for Pembroke Dock) 32
G.P. Brewer, Narberth 29, Liberal
R, Thomas, Trebover 29, Liberal
W. Evans, Bletherston 28, Liberal
Ben Rees, Granant 28, Liberal
H. Jno Thomas, Lochturfin 28, Liberal
W. Watts Williams, St David's 28, Liberal
Sir Charles Philipps, Conservative (elected councillor for Slebech and Martletwy) 22

By-elections
Five vacancies were caused by the election of aldermen.

Pembroke Dock  by-election
The election to replace the Mayor of Pembroke was fought on political lines.

St Ishmaels  by-election
The election which followed the elevation of Lord Kensington was not fought on political lines.

References

1889
19th century in Pembrokeshire
Pembrokeshire